"Drawn from Life" is also the name of a series of short animated films by Paul Fierlinger
Drawn from Life is a 2001 music album by the British ambient musician Brian Eno and the German composer J. Peter Schwalm.

Track listing (original UK vinyl pressing)
All tracks composed by Eno and Schwalm, except where stated.
 "From This Moment" – 1:21
 "Persis" – 7:41
 "More Dust" – 6:01
 "Night Traffic" – 8:19
 "Two Voices" – 3:59
 "Rising Dust" – 7:44
 "Intenser" – 5:23
 "Like Pictures Part #1" – 1:20 (Eno, Schwalm & Holger Czukay)
 "Like Pictures Part #2" – 5:48 (Eno, Schwalm & Laurie Anderson)
 "Bloom" – 7:10

Track listing (subsequent releases)
 "From This Moment" – 1:21
 "Persis" – 7:41
 "Like Pictures Part #1" – 1:20
 "Like Pictures Part #2" – 5:48
 "Night Traffic" – 8:19
 "Rising Dust" – 7:44
 "Intenser" – 5:23
 "More Dust" – 6:01
 "Bloom" – 7:10
 "Two Voices" – 3:59
 "Bloom" (Instrumental Version) – 7:07

Personnel
 Brian Eno, composing, performing, cover art 
 J. Peter Schwalm, composing, performing, mixing, premastering 
With:
 Leo Abrahams, guitar on "Rising Dust", "Intenser" 
 Laurie Anderson, voice on "Like Pictures Part #2" 
 Nell Catchpole, strings on "Persis", "Like Pictures Part #2", "Rising Dust", "Intenser", "Bloom"
 Holger Czukay, IBM Dictaphone on "Like Pictures Part #1" 
 Darla Eno and Irial Eno, voices on "Bloom"
 Heiko Himmighoffen, percussion on "Night Traffic", "Rising Dust", "Intenser" 
 Lynn Gerlach, voice on "Rising Dust"
 Michy Nakao, voice on "Like Pictures Part #1"

References

Brian Eno albums
2001 albums